The 2020–21 Western Kentucky Hilltoppers men's basketball team represented Western Kentucky University during the 2020–21 NCAA Division I men's basketball season. The Hilltoppers were led by head coach Rick Stansbury in his fifth season and played their home games at E. A. Diddle Arena in Bowling Green, Kentucky as seventh-year members of Conference USA.  The team finished the season in first place in the C-USA East Division and with the best conference record overall at 18-6 . They defeated UTSA and UAB to advance to the finals where they lost to North Texas. They received a bid to the 2021 National Invitation Tournament where they defeated Saint Mary’s in the First Round before losing to fellow conference member Louisiana Tech in the quarterfinals. Center Charles Bassey was named the Conference USA Player of the Year, and Defensive Player of the Year. Taveion Hollingsworth joined Bassey on the All-Conference Team, while Josh Anderson joined him on C-USA’s All-Defensive Team, and Dayvion McKnight made the All-Freshman Team.

Previous season
The Hilltoppers finished the 2019–20 season with 20–10, 13–5 in C-USA play to finish in second place. The 2020 Conference USA men's basketball tournament, and the remainder of the season was cancelled due to the COVID-19 pandemic.

Roster

Schedule 

|-
!colspan=12 style=| Regular season
|-

|-

|-
!colspan=12 style=| CUSA conference tournament
|-

|-
!colspan=12 style=| NIT

Notes

References

Western Kentucky
Western Kentucky Hilltoppers basketball seasons
Western Kentucky Basketball, Men's
Western Kentucky Basketball, Men's
Western Kentucky